Argenta is an unincorporated community and census-designated place (CDP) in Beaverhead County, Montana, United States. Argenta is in the valley of Rattlesnake Creek, a southeast-flowing tributary of the Beaverhead River, part of the Jefferson River watershed leading to the Missouri and finally the Mississippi River.

Argenta was first listed as a CDP prior to the 2020 census.

Demographics

References 

Census-designated places in Beaverhead County, Montana
Census-designated places in Montana